Maren Hammerschmidt (born 24 October 1989) is a former German biathlete. She has won a bronze and a gold medal with the German Women's Relay team at the Biathlon World Championships 2016 and 2017.

Record

Olympic Games

World Championships

World Cup

Relay victories

References

External links

1989 births
Living people
German female biathletes
Biathlon World Championships medalists
People from Winterberg
Sportspeople from Arnsberg (region)
Olympic biathletes of Germany
Biathletes at the 2018 Winter Olympics